Edward George Nicholson (September 9, 1923 – January 15, 1987) was a Canadian  professional ice hockey defenceman who played in one National Hockey League game for the Detroit Red Wings during the 1947–48 season, on March 21, 1948 against the Toronto Maple Leafs. The rest of his career, which lasted from 1943 to 1955, was spent in various minor leagues.

Career statistics

Regular season and playoffs

See also
 List of players who played only one game in the NHL

External links
 

1923 births
1987 deaths
Canadian ice hockey defencemen
Detroit Red Wings players
Ice hockey people from Ontario
Ontario Hockey Association Senior A League (1890–1979) players
Sportspeople from Kingston, Ontario
St. Louis Flyers players